The Aslivka is a left tributary of Besnica Creek, which flows through the Besnica Valley east of Ljubljana and joins the Ljubljanica at Podgrad as its last right tributary just before it joins the Sava River.

See also 
List of rivers of Slovenia

References

External links
Aslivka Creek on Geopedia 

Rivers of Lower Carniola